Mario Luzi (20 October 1914 – 28 February 2005) was an Italian poet.

Biography
Born in Castello, near Sesto Fiorentino, Luzi's parents, Ciro Luzi and Margherita Papini, hailed from Samprugnano (later Semproniano). He spent his youth in Castello, where he started his primary school. In Florence he studied at the liceo classico Galileo, and also in Florence he obtained his degree in French literature with a final dissertation about François Mauriac. This was an important period for Luzi. He met poets such as Piero Bigongiari, Alessandro Parronchi, Carlo Bo, Leone Traverso, and the critic Oreste Macrì.

His first book, La barca, was published in 1935 and in 1938 he started to teach in high schools in the cities of Parma, San Miniato and Rome.

In 1940, he published Avvento notturno; in 1945 he went back to Florence and there he taught at the liceo scientifico.
In 1946 he published Un brindisi e Quaderno gotico, in issue 1 of Inventario, in 1952 Onore del vero, Principe del deserto e Studio su Mallarmé. In 1955 he began teaching French literature at Florence University in the Facoltà di scienze politiche (Political Studies Institute).

Between 1963 and 1983, he published many books such as Nel magma (1963); Dal fondo delle campagne (1965); Semiserie (1979), Reportage (1985). In 1978, with the book Al fuoco della controversia, he won the Viareggio Prize (Premio Viareggio). He won the Aristeion Prize in 1991 for his work Frasi e Incisi di un Canto Salutare; in the same year he was proposed for the first time by the Accademia dei Lincei for the Nobel Prize in Literature. Ultimately never awarded, when asked for his thoughts by one reporter on his fellow countryman Dario Fo's 1997 success he slammed the phone down: "I'll say only this. I've just about had it up to here!"

His last book, L'avventura della dualità, was published in 2003. In October 2004, he was appointed to the Italian Senate as a senator-for-life by President of the Republic Ciampi. He died in Florence, just some months later, on 28 February 2005.

List of works
 La barca (1935)
 Avvento notturno (1940)
 Biografia a Ebe (1942)
 Un brindisi (1946)
 Quaderno gotico (1947)
 Primizie del deserto (1952)
 Onore del vero (1957)
Il giusto della vita (1960)
 Nel magma (1963; new edition, 1966)
 Dal fondo delle campagne (1965)
 Su fondamenti invisibili (1971)
 Al fuoco della controversia (1978)
 Semiserie (1979)
 Reportage, un poemetto seguito dal Taccuino di viaggio in Cina (1980)
 Per il battesimo dei nostri frammenti (1985)
 La cordigliera delle Ande e altri versi tradotti (1983)
 Frasi e incisi di un canto salutare (1990)
 Viaggio terrestre e celeste di Simone Martini (1994)
 Il fiore del dolore (2003)
 L'avventura della dualità (2003)

References

External links
 Mario Luzi's webpage 
 Obituary on Corriere della Sera'' 

1914 births
2005 deaths
Italian life senators
Italian male poets
People from the Province of Florence
Viareggio Prize winners
20th-century Italian poets
20th-century Italian male writers